Coon Rapids–Riverdale station is a commuter rail station in Coon Rapids, Minnesota, located at 3050 Northdale Boulevard NW, south of the Riverdale shopping centers. It is served by the Northstar Commuter Rail line. The station features bicycle lockers and a park and ride lot with capacity for 466 vehicles. The commute time to downtown Minneapolis from this station is about 28 minutes. The fare to downtown Minneapolis from this station is $3.25 at all times; the fare to and from any other station is $3.25 on weekdays and $2.75 on weekends and holidays.

As of the station's opening in 2009, signage simply called it "Coon Rapids" or "Coon Rapids Station". A second station in the city is planned at Foley Boulevard (just north of Minnesota State Highway 610), where there is currently a bus station with a large parking ramp for park and ride service. The Foley station would then be available as a stop on the Northern Lights Express to Duluth and the proposed Bethel Corridor line, since it is less than a mile south of the Coon Creek rail junction, where the tracks split and to go toward Bethel and Duluth.

References

External links
Coon Rapids Riverdale Station, Northstar Corridor Development Authority (NCDA)

Northstar Line stations
Railway stations in the United States opened in 2009
Railway stations in Anoka County, Minnesota
2009 establishments in Minnesota